Manjula Jayawardene (born 24 March 1983) is a Sri Lankan cricketer. He made his first-class debut in the 2002/03 season, and has played 90 first-class matches.

References

External links
 

1983 births
Living people
Sri Lankan cricketers
Sri Lanka Police Sports Club cricketers
Vauniya District cricketers